Ron Knight was a rugby league footballer who played for Canterbury-Bankstown and Western Suburbs in the 1930s and 1940s. He was used as a utility and played many positions including as a centre, winger and five-eighth.

Playing career
Knight made his first grade debut for Western Suburbs in 1935 against St George at the Sydney Cricket Ground.  Knight spent three seasons with Wests in first grade and two seasons in reserve grade for the club.

In 1941, Knight joined Canterbury-Bankstown and in 1942 played in only one game which was the 1942 NSWRL grand final against Eastern Suburbs.  An injury to Roy McCarter meant that Knight was called into the side as a replacement.  Canterbury went on to win their second premiership defeating Easts 11–9.  Knight played one further season for Canterbury in 1943 before retiring.

References

Year of birth missing
Year of death missing
Australian rugby league players
Canterbury-Bankstown Bulldogs players
Western Suburbs Magpies players
Rugby league players from New South Wales
Rugby league utility players